Euston is a small town on the banks of the Murray River, southern New South Wales, Australia in Balranald Shire.  The twin town of Robinvale is on the other side of the river in the state of Victoria.

Until the irrigation development at Robinvale, Euston was the main town in the area. A post office opened on 1 May 1852. It closed in 1853, then reopened in 1856.

History
Charles Sturt passed through the general country in 1830, and Charles Lockhart in 1862.
In 1876 the settlement at Euston was described in the following terms:
Euston is a crossing-place for sheep and cattle.  There is a Custom-house officer here, though I should judge that his avocations were not of an extremely onerous nature, and the township also possesses a post and telegraph office.  If the building can be taken as a type of the township, Euston has not a long life before it.  The walls appear as if rent apart by an earthquake.  The hotels and about a dozen small  houses constitute the remainder of the township.

Euston and Robinvale are home to a large Italian population from the southern province of Calabria in Italy.

Euston has the Euston Sports and Recreation Club and the Euston Pub.

The town used to field an Australian rules football team competing in the Millewa Football League; however, they were forced to merge with Robinvale due to lack of players in part caused by the establishment of Robinvale rugby league club.

Euston is a gateway to the Murray River and Sunraysia district, known for its fishing, including the Murray cod and other native species, now threatened by the European carp.

References

External links 

 Euston Railway Siding

Towns in New South Wales
Populated places on the Murray River
Balranald Shire